Bryce Chadwick Salvador (born February 11, 1976) is a Canadian former professional ice hockey defenceman. Salvador was drafted in the sixth round, 138th overall by the Tampa Bay Lightning in the 1994 NHL Entry Draft. During his professional career, he played for the St. Louis Blues and the New Jersey Devils.

Salvador is of African and Brazilian descent on his father's side, and Ukrainian on his mother's side.

Playing career

Salvador entered the NHL with a reputation as a gritty defenseman and engaged in three fights in his first 15 games. While in St. Louis, Salvador created a program with teammate Jamal Mayers called Jam 'n Sal's Community Stars, which recognizes kids who perform small acts of kindness and generosity. Salvador was traded from the St. Louis Blues to the Devils for Cam Janssen. On July 1, 2008, Salvador re-signed with the Devils to a four-year deal worth $11.6 million.

On January 17, 2013, due to his leadership in the locker room and somewhat lengthy tenure on the roster, he was named the 10th captain in the New Jersey Devils history, and the third black captain in NHL history, behind Dirk Graham and Jarome Iginla. Due to lower back injuries, Salvador only played in 94 games since the start of the 2012-13 season.

On September 2, 2015, Salvador announced his retirement from professional hockey after playing for 14 seasons.

Career statistics

Broadcasting career
Since 2017, Salvador has been the television studio analyst for all Devils home games on MSG+.

See also
List of black NHL players

References

External links

1976 births
Living people
Black Canadian ice hockey players
Canadian ice hockey defencemen
Canadian people of Brazilian descent
Canadian people of Ukrainian descent
Ice hockey people from Manitoba
Lethbridge Hurricanes players
Missouri River Otters players
New Jersey Devils players
Sportspeople from Brandon, Manitoba
St. Louis Blues players
Tampa Bay Lightning draft picks
Worcester IceCats players